Ko, Lamphun is a village and tambon (subdistrict) of Li District, in Lamphun Province, Thailand. In 2005 it had a population of 2425 people. The tambon contains four villages.

References

Tambon of Lamphun province
Populated places in Lamphun province